SS Tregenna was a cargo steamship that was launched in England in 1919 and sunk by a U-boat in the Battle of the Atlantic in 1940 with the loss of 33 of her 37 crew. She was laid down as War Bulldog, but the Hain Steam Ship Co bought her before she was completed and renamed her Tregenna.

Building
William Gray & Company built Tregenna at its shipyard in West Hartlepool. She was built to the Shipping Controller's First World War standard design B. She was launched on 1 May 1919 and completed that July.

Gray's Central Marine Engineering Works in West Hartlepool built Tregennas three-cylinder triple expansion steam engine.

Peacetime service
In August 1921 Tregenna reported sighting the wreckage of a SNETA Farman Goliath aircraft that had ditched in the English Channel.

On 7 August 1930 Tregenna ran aground at Alligator Pond, Jamaica. She was refloated on 10 August 1930 and returned to service.

In 1933–34 the call sign GCDX superseded Tregennas code letters KBSW.

Second World War service
From November 1939 to February 1940 Tregenna sailed from New Zealand via New South Wales and South Africa to Freetown in Sierra Leone, where she joined Convoy SL 18 to return to Liverpool in England. In March and April 1940 she sailed to and from northern Norway. She left Ålesund with Convoy HN 25 on 9 April, the day after the German invasion of Norway began.

From May 1940 Tregenna made transatlantic crossings to bring steel from Philadelphia to South Wales, sailing eastbound in HX convoys from Halifax, Nova Scotia to UK waters. That June she sailed in Convoy HX 49, and discharged her cargo in Swansea.

Loss
On 1 September Tregenna left Philadelphia carrying 8,000 tons of steel bound for Newport. On 5 September she joined Convoy HX 71 from Halifax. HX 91 had nine columns, and Tregenna was the first ship of the ninth column.

On 17 September HX 71 was in the Western Approaches west of Scotland. Tregenna sank rapidly, killing her Master, 31 members of her crew and a DEMS gunner. Another member of HX 71, the cargo ship Filleigh, rescued four survivors and landed them at Avonmouth.

See also

References

1919 ships
Maritime incidents in 1930
Maritime incidents in September 1940
Ships built on the River Tees
Ships sunk by German submarines in World War II
Steamships of the United Kingdom
World War II merchant ships of the United Kingdom
World War II shipwrecks in the North Sea